Uttara Sporting Club is a cricket team in Bangladesh, named after the suburb of Uttara in the north-west of Dhaka. They were one of the twelve teams to take part in the 2018–19 Dhaka Premier Division Twenty20 Cricket League and the 2018–19 Dhaka Premier Division Cricket League.

In February 2019, they won their opening fixture of the 2018–19 Dhaka Premier Division Twenty20 Cricket League, beating Khelaghar Samaj Kallyan Samity by six wickets. The following month, they won their opening match of the 2018–19 Dhaka Premier Division Cricket League, beating Sheikh Jamal Dhanmondi Club by 9 runs. However, following the conclusion of the group stage fixtures, the team finished bottom of the table, and therefore moved to the Relegation League playoffs section of the tournament. In the relegation playoffs, they finished in second place of the three teams, and were relegated to the First Division for the next season.

List A record
 2018-19: 13 matches, won 4, finished eleventh

References

Dhaka Premier Division Cricket League teams